Rajapakshe Wasala Tennakoon Mudiyanselage Ranjith Bandara (born 4 November 1961) is a Sri Lankan economist, academic, politician and Member of Parliament.

Bandara was born on 4 November 1961. He was educated at Sirimalwatte Rajakiya Vidyalaya. He has a BA degree in economics from the University of Peradeniya (1990) and a MA degree in economics from the University of Colombo (1992). He has a MSc degree in management of natural resources and sustainable agriculture from the Agricultural University of Norway (1995) and PhD in economics from the University of Queensland (2003).

Bandara was a senior lecturer at the University of Colombo's Department of Economics before becoming a professor. He has been a consultant to several Sri Lankan businesses. Following the 2020 parliamentary election he was appointed to the Parliament of Sri Lanka as a National List MP representing the Sri Lanka People's Freedom Alliance.

Bandara is the author of The Economics of Human-Elephant Conflict. He was a director on the National Livestock Development Board, Sri Lanka-Libya Agricultural and Livestock Development Company and Merchant Bank of Sri Lanka.

References

1961 births
Academic staff of the University of Colombo
Alumni of the University of Colombo
Alumni of the University of Peradeniya
Living people
Members of the 16th Parliament of Sri Lanka
Norwegian University of Life Sciences alumni
Sinhalese academics
Sinhalese politicians
Sri Lankan Buddhists
Sri Lankan economists
Sri Lanka People's Freedom Alliance politicians
Sri Lanka Podujana Peramuna politicians
University of Queensland alumni